This is a list of notable people with the given name of Alan:

A
Alan Abel, American hoaxer
Alan Acosta (born 1996), Mexican footballer
Alan Alda, American actor
Alan Aldridge, British artist
Alan Agayev (born 1977), Russian footballer
Alan Aguerre (born 1990), Argentine footballer
Alan Aguirre (born 1993), Argentine footballer
Alan Alegre (born 1991), Argentine footballer
Alan Ameche, American football player
Alan Anderson, various
Alan Arario (born 1995), Argentine footballer
Alan Archibald, Scottish football player and manager
Alan Arkin, American actor
Alan Ashby (born 1951), American baseball player and sports commentator
Alan Ashby, guitarist for the band Of Mice & Men
Alan Autry, American actor, politician, and former National Football League player
Alan Ayckbourn, British playwright

B
Alan Bagayev (born 1991), Russian footballer 
Alan Bahia (born 1983), Brazilian footballer
Alan Ball, various
Alan Bannister (born 1951), American baseball player
Alan Baró (born 1985), Spanish footballer
Alan Basset, English baron
Alan Bates, British actor
Alan Baxter, various
Alan Bean (1932–2018), fourth person to walk on the moon
Alan Becker, American animator and YouTube personality
Alan Benes (born 1972), American baseball pitcher
Alan Benítez (born 1994), Paraguayan footballer
Alan Bennett, various
Alan Bersten, American dancer
Alan Bidi (born 1995), Ivorian footballer
Alan Blayney (born 1981), Irish goaltender and coach
Alan Bonansea (born 1996), Argentine footballer
Alan Bond, Australian businessman
Alan Bonner (born 1990), American football player
Alan Branch (born 1984), American football player
Alan Brazil (born 1959), Scottish footballer and broadcaster
Alan Brice (1937–2016), American baseball pitcher
Alan Brooke, 1st Viscount Alanbrooke, British Soldier
Alan Brown, various
Alan Browne (born 1995), Irish footballer
Alan Burton, various
Alan Busenitz, American professional baseball pitcher
Alan Bush, British composer and pianist
Alan Byrne, various
Alan Byron, Australian rules football player

C
 Alan Caldwell (born 1956), American football player
 Alan Campos (born 1973), American football player
 Alan Carr, English comedian
 Alan Catello Grazioso, American filmmaker
 Alan Peter Cayetano, Filipino politician and current speaker of the House of Representatives
 Alan Clark, British Conservative Member of Parliament, author and diarist
 Alan Cockrell (born 1962), American baseball player and coach
 Alan Collins, various
 Alan Colmes, American radio and television host
 Alan Connell, English footballer
 Alan Cranston, American politician and journalist
 Alan Cross (born 1993), American football player
 Alan Cumming, Scottish-American actor
 Alan Curbishley, English football player and manager
 Alan Curtis, various

D
Alan Davies, English comedian
Alan Dershowitz, American lawyer and academic
Alan Dukes, Irish politician
Alan Duncan, British politician
Alan Dzagoev, Russian footballer
Alan Dean Foster, American author

E 

 Alan Embree (born 1970), American baseball pitcher

F 

 Alan Faneca (born 1976), American football player
 Alan Foster, various
 Alan Fowlkes (born 1958), American baseball pitcher

G 
Alan García, Peruvian politician
Alan Garner, English novelist
Alan Gemmell, Scottish biology professor
Alan Gilzean, Scottish footballer
Alan B. Gold (1917–2005), chief justice of the Quebec Superior Court from 1983 to 1992
Alan Gow, Scottish footballer
Alan Grant, various
Alan Greenspan, American economist
Alan Gross, U.S. government contractor employed by the United States Agency for International Development (USAID)
Alan Gurr (born 1982), Australian racing driver
Alan Guth, American theoretical physicist and cosmologist

H
Alan Hale, various
Alan Haller (born 1970), American football player
Alan Hansen, Scottish footballer and television pundit
Alan Hardy, various
Alan Hargesheimer (born 1954), American baseball pitcher
Alan Harper, various
Alan Haworth (born 1960), Canadian ice hockey player
Alan Henderson (1944–2017), Northern Irish bassist for the rock band Them
Alan Henderson (born 1972), American basketball player
Alan Hepple (born 1963), Canadian ice hockey player
Alan Hevesi, American politician and convicted felon
Alan Hodgkin, English physiologist, biophysicist and Nobel laureate
Alan Hovhaness, American composer
Alan Howard, various
Alan Hutton, Scottish footballer

I
Alan Igbon (1952–2020), English actor
Alan Igglesden, English cricket player
Alan Isler, American novelist and professor
Alan Irvine, various

J
Alan Jackson (born 1958), American country singer
Alan Jacobs, various
Alan Jacobson, Australian cricket player
Alan Jefferies, Australian poet and children's writer
Alan Johnson, various
Alan Johnston, British journalist
Alan Jones, various
Alan Judge, various
Alan Julian, footballer

K
Alan Kardec, Brazilian footballer
Alan Kay, American computer scientist.
Alan Keane, various
Alan Kelly, various
Alan Kenneally, various 
Alan Kerr (born 1964), Canadian ice hockey player
Alan Khazei, American social entrepreneur
Alan King, American actor and comedian
Alan Kirby, Irish footballer
Alan Knicely (born 1955), American baseball player
Alan Koch, various
Alan Krashesky, American journalist
Alan Kulwicki (1954–1993), American auto racing driver and team owner
Alan Kuntz (1919–1987), Canadian ice hockey player

L
Alan Ladd, American actor
Alan Lascelles, British courtier and civil servant
Alan Lee, various
Alan Letang (born 1975), Canadian-Croatian ice hockey player
Alan Licht, American guitarist and composer
Alan Lightman, American physicist, writer, and social entrepreneur
Alan Ling, Malaysian lawyer and politician
Alan Longmuir (1948–2018), Scottish bassist, founding member of the pop band Bay City Rollers

M
Alan McCormack, Irish footballer
Alan McLeod McCulloch, Australian art critic
Alan MacDiarmid, New Zealand-born American chemist and Nobel laureate
Alan May (born 1965), Canadian ice hockey player
Alan McDonald, various
Alan Mcilwraith, Scottish former call centre worker from Glasgow who was exposed as a military impostor
Alan McInally, Scottish footballer
Alan McLoughlin, footballer
Alan McManus, snooker player
Alan McNicoll, senior officer in the Royal Australian Navy (RAN) and diplomat
Alan Mangan, Irish footballer for Westmeath
Alan Manning, British economist
Alan Menken, American composer, songwriter, music conductor, director and record producer
Alan Miller, various
Alan Mills, various
Alan Alexander Milne, English author
Alan Moore, English writer
Alan Murphy, various
Alan Myers (drummer) (1954–2013), American drummer for the rock band Devo

N
Alan Napier, English actor
Alan Navarro, English footballer
Alan Neilson, Welsh footballer
Alan Nelmes, English footballer
Alan Newman (baseball) (born 1969), American baseball pitcher
Alan Norris, various
Alan North, American actor
Alan Nugawela (died 2007), Sri Lankan Sinhala army officer
Alan Nunnelee, American businessman and politician

O
Alan Oakes, English footballer
Alan O'Brien, Irish footballer
Alan O'Connor (Gaelic footballer), Irish Gaelic footballer
Alan O'Day, American singer-songwriter
Alan O'Donoghue, Australian rules football player
Alan Ogg (1967–2009), American basketball player
Alan O'Hara, Irish footballer
Alan O'Hare, Irish footballer
Alan Old, English rugby union player
Alan Oldham, American techno DJ, producer, label owner, graphic artist, and painter
Alan O'Leary, Canadian curler
Alan Oliver, British sports journalist
Alan O'Neill, several people
Alan Opie, English baritone
Alan Osmond, American singer

P
Alan Page (born 1945), American jurist and football player
Alan Pardew, English football player and manager
Alan Parker, English filmmaker
Alan Pastrana (1944–2021), American football player
Alan Perlis, American computer scientist and professor
Alan Poindexter (1961-2012), American astronaut
Alan Pringle (born 1952), American football player

Q
Alan Quaife, Australian rules football player
Alan Quine, Canadian ice hockey player
Alan Quinlan, Irish rugby union player
Alan Quinlivan, Australian rugby league player
Alan Quinn, Irish footballer
Alan Quirke, Irish sportsman

R
Alan Rabinowitz (1953-2018), American zoologist
Alan Rees, various
Alan Reid, various
Alan Resnick (born 1986), American comedian
Alan Reuber (born 1981), American football player
Alan Rickman (1946–2016), English actor
Alan Ricard (born 1977), American football player and coach
Alan Risher (born 1961), American football player
Alan Rittinger (1925–2017), Canadian ice hockey player
Alan Rogers, various
Alan Rollinson (1943–2019), British racing driver

S
Alan Shearer, English footballer
Alan Shepard (1923–1998), American astronaut
Alan Sawyer (1928–2012), American basketball player
Alan Seiden (1937–2008), American collegiate and basketball player
Alan Smith, various
Alan Stacey (1933–1960), British racing driver
Alan Stokes (born 1996), American internet celebrity 
Alan Storke (1884–1910), American baseball player 
Alan Strange (1906–1994), American baseball player and manager 
Alan Sugar (born 1947), British businessman

T
Alan Tam, Hong Kong singer and actor
Alan Taylor, various
Alan Thicke (1947–2016), Canadian actor
Alan Thomas, various
Alan Trammell (born 1958), American baseball player, manager, and coach
Alan Trejo (born 1996), American baseball player
Alan Tudyk, American actor
Alan Turing, English mathematician

U
Alan Unwin, Canadian politician
Alan Ure, English football manager
Alan Uryga, Polish footballer

V
Alan van der Merwe (born 1980), South African racing driver
Alan Vaughan-Richards, British-Nigerian architect
Alan Veingrad (born 1963), American football player and public speaker
Alan Velasco, Argentine footballer
Alan Vince, British archaeologist

W
Alan Walker, various
Alan Watts, British-American philosopher
Alan West, various
Alan Wiggins (1958–1991), American baseball player
Alan Wiggins Jr. (born 1985), American basketball player
Alan Wilder, English musician
Alan Williams, various
Alan Winde, South African politician
Alan Wirth (born 1956), American baseball pitcher
Alan Wong, British born Chinese legend

Z 

 Alan Zinter (born 1968), American baseball player and coach

Fictional Characters 

 Alan Frog, a vampire hunter from the film The Lost Boys

See also

Alan (surname)
Alen (given name)
Allan (name)
Allen (given name)

Alan